Debbie C. Crans is a Professor of Organic, Inorganic and Biological Chemistry and of Cell and Molecular Biology at Colorado State University, where she also is a Professor Laureate of the College of Natural Sciences. Crans specializes in the fundamental chemistry and biochemistry of drugs, with particular focus on vanadium and other transition metal ions as metals in medicine and investigation of their mechanisms of toxicity.

Education
Debbie Crans studied at the University of Copenhagen, studying for her Cand. Scient. 1. part (B.S.) in 1974–1978, then her Cand. Scient. 2. part (research) in 1978–1980. During this time, she worked with Prof. James P. Snyder at Copenhagen, and Prof. Paul von Ragué Schleyer at the University of Erlangen–Nuremberg in Germany on computational studies of free radicals. She then moved to Harvard University in the United States to pursue graduate studies in the laboratory of Prof. George M. Whitesides. At Harvard, Crans worked on enzyme-catalyzed phosphorylation reactions, using glycerol kinase to synthesize chiral analogs of glycerol. She graduated with her Ph.D. in 1985.  She went on to do postdoctoral work with Orville L. Chapman and Paul D. Boyer at the University of California, Los Angeles from 1985–1986, studying the mechanistic enzymology of the F1 subunit of ATP synthase from chloroplasts and beef heart.

Independent career and research
Crans began her independent career as an assistant professor at Colorado State University in 1987. She was promoted to Associate Professor in 1991, and full Professor in 1998.

Crans is known for her work on the role of vanadium in biological systems, especially the effects of its compounds on diabetes. She has worked as senior editor several books on vanadium, such as Vanadium Compounds: Chemistry, Biochemistry, and Therapeutic Applications, Vanadium: The Versatile Metal and Vanadium in Biochemistry. Crans served as chair of the American Chemical Society in 2015 and 2016. She has also been associate editor for the New Journal of Chemistry, Inorganic Chemistry, the Journal of Inorganic Biochemistry and Coordination Chemistry Reviews.

Crans has contributed to over 215 peer-reviewed articles. As of spring 2019, her work has been cited 7,200 times excluding self-citations making her h-index of 53. Her review paper, "The chemistry and biochemistry of vanadium and the biological activities exerted by vanadium compounds" has been cited over 900 times. Her study on "Effects of vanadium complexes with organic ligands on glucose metabolism: a comparison study in diabetic rats" describes the use of vanadium compounds as hypoglycemic agents, and it has been widely cited.

Awards

International Awards 

 2019 ACS Award for Distinguished Service in the Advancement of Inorganic Chemistry
 2015 Arthur C. Cope Scholar Award
 2012 Lectureship award, Japanese Coordination Chemistry Society
 2004 Vanadis award from the International Vanadium Symposium in Szeged
 2000 Japan Society of Promotion of Science award
 2000 Alexander Humboldt Senior Research awardee

National Awards 

 2017 ChemLuminary Awards Young Chemists Committee
 2016 Royal Society Fellow
 2014 AAAS Fellow
 2009 ACS Fellow
 1993-96 Alfred P. Sloan Research Fellow
 1994 Alberta Heritage Foundation award
 1990-1992 Eli Lilly Young Investigator Award
 1989-1994 National Institutes of Health FIRST award

Personal life 
She currently resides in Northern Colorado with her husband and three daughters. One daughter is pursuing the PhD in chemistry at Northwestern University, one is an undergraduate student at Colorado State University, and one works as a financial planner.

References 

Danish women chemists
American women chemists
Bioinorganic chemists
Harvard University alumni
Danish emigrants to the United States
Living people
Colorado State University faculty
University of Copenhagen alumni
1955 births
Place of birth missing (living people)
American women academics
21st-century American women